Double Robotics is a technology startup company that produces iPad-based telepresence robots called Double and Double2. Double, which resembles a Segway PT, has a price of $2,499. 

The robot uses gyroscope and accelerometer sensors in its base, and can be controlled with a desktop, tablet, or smartphone.

Double Robotics received seed funding from Y Combinator. Johnson & Johnson and The Coca-Cola Company are testing Double and seven Fortune 500 companies have preordered. Preorders total over $500,000. Customer deliveries began February 2013.

As of January 2017, the company claims about 8000 robots being sold since 2013.

In August 2019, the company debuted the Double 3, a robot intended to increase productivity of remote workers and distance learners.

See also 
 3D printing

References

External links
Double Robotics company website

Robotics companies of the United States
Technology companies based in the San Francisco Bay Area
Companies based in Mountain View, California